A pseudo-anglicism is a word in another language that is formed from English elements and may appear to be English, but that does not exist as an English word with the same meaning.

For example, English speakers traveling in France may be struck by the "number of anglicisms—or rather words that look English—which are used in a different sense than they have in English, or which do not exist in English (such as rallye-paper, shake-hand, baby-foot, or baby-parc)".

This is different from a false friend, which is a word with a cognate that has a different main meaning. Sometimes pseudo-anglicisms become false friends.

Definition and terminology
Pseudo-anglicisms are also called secondary anglicisms, false anglicisms, or pseudo-English.

Pseudo-anglicisms are a kind of lexical borrowing where the source or donor language is English, but where the borrowing is reworked in the receptor  or recipient language.

The precise definition varies. Duckworth defines pseudo-anglicisms in German as "neologisms derived from English language material." Furiassi includes words that may exist in English with a "conspicuously different meaning".

Typology and mechanism
Pseudo-anglicisms can be created in various ways, such as by archaism, i.e., words which once had that meaning in English but are since abandoned; semantic slide, where an English word is used incorrectly to mean something else; conversion of existing words from one part of speech to another; or recombinations by reshuffling English units.

Onysko speaks of two types: pseudo-anglicisms and hybrid anglicisms. The common factor is that each type represents a neologism in the receptor language resulting from a combination of borrowed lexical items from English. Using German as the receptor language, an example of the first type is Wellfit-Bar, a combination of two English lexical units to form a new term in German, which does not exist in English, and which carries the meaning, "a bar that caters to the needs of health-starved people."  An example of the second type, is a hybrid based on a German compound word, Weitsprung (long jump), plus the English 'coach', to create the new German word Weitsprung-Coach.

According to Filipović, pseudoanglicisms can be formed through composition, derivation, or ellipsis.  Composition in Serbo-Croatian involves creating a new compound from an English word to which is added the word man, as in the example, "GOAL" + man, giving golman.  In derivation, a suffix -er or -ist is added to an anglicism, to create a new word in Serbo-Croatian, such as teniser, or waterpolist. An ellipsis drops something, and starts from a compound and drops a component, or from a derivative and drops -ing, as in boks from "boxing", or "hepiend" from "happy ending".

Another process of word formation that can result in a pseudo-anglicism is a blend word, consisting of portions of two words, like brunch or smog. Rey-Debove & Gagnon attest tansad in French in 1919, from English tan[dem] + sad[dle].

Scope

Pseudo-anglicisms can be found in many languages that have contact with English around the world, and are attested in nearly all European languages.

The equivalent of pseudo-Anglicisms derived from languages other than English also exist. For example, the English-language phrase "double entendre," while often believed to be French and pronounced in a French fashion, is not actually used in French. For other examples, see dog Latin, list of pseudo-French words adapted to English, and list of pseudo-German words adapted to English.

Examples

Many languages

Some pseudo-anglicisms are found in many languages and have been characterized as "world-wide pseudo-English", often borrowed via other languages such as French or Italian:
 autostop – hitchhiking in French, Italian, Polish, Serbo-Croatian, Greek οτοστόπ, Russian автостоп, Spanish, Bulgarian, Hungarian, Dutch, etc.
 basket – basketball in Danish, French, Dutch, Indonesian, Italian, Spanish, Swedish, Greek μπάσκετ, Turkish, etc.; also sneakers in French
 camping – campsite or campground in French, Greek κάμπινγκ, Bulgarian къмпинг, Russian ке́мпинг, Polish kemping, etc.
 smoking – dinner jacket, tuxedo, or smoking jacket in Danish, French, German, Italian, Greek σμόκιν, Russian, etc.

Japanese

  – a white collar employee (salaried worker)
 Pokémon (ポケモン,"pocket monster")

Korean 

 one shot – "bottoms up" (원샷 [wʌn.ɕjat̚])
 hand phone – "cellphone" (핸드폰 [hɛn.dɯ.pon])
 skinship - platonic hand-holding, hugging, etc. (스킨십; seu·kin·sib)

Romance

French
French includes many pseudo-anglicisms, including novel compounds (baby-foot), specifically compounds in -man (tennisman), truncations (foot), places in -ing (dancing meaning dancing-place, not the act of dancing), and a large variety of meaning shifts.

  (m, pronounced ) – table football
  – playpen
  – music quiz / 'name that tune'
  – blow-dry and styling
  – high-rise building, tower block
  – dance hall
  – a brief romance, flirtation, a boyfriend or girlfriend
  – jogging (though the real English word is also used in French with the same meaning)
  (m, Belgium) – late-opening grocery shop
  – dry cleaning shop,
   – a "fox-and-hounds" like game, except with paper scraps instead of foxes
  (m;; f:) – record holder, especially in sports
  (verb) to make over; also:  (n; masc.) – a makeover
  (n; masc.) – rugby player
 
  – shampoo
 ,  (feminine) – radio or television announcer
  – luxury, prestige
  – surfing
  – a tennis player

Italian

 autogrill – rest area (used for any brand, not only for Autogrill chain)
 beauty farm – spa
 The French borrowing bloc-notes is sometimes written in the pseudo-English form block-notes – notebook
 jolly – the joker in a pack of cards
 smart working  – remote work, where "smart" is used referring to other devices with internet connection, such as smartphones and smartwatches.

Brazilian Portuguese

  – usb flash drive «pendrive»

Germanic

Danish
 babylift – baby transport/carrycot
 butterfly – bow tie
 cottoncoat – trench coat
 cowboytoast – minced meat sandwich
 grillparty – a barbecue party
 monkeyclass – economy class
 speedmarker – a felt-tip pen
 stationcar – conflation of station wagon (US) and estate car (UK)
 timemanager – a calendar or notebook in which one writes down appointments (from the registered trademark Time Manager)

Dutch

 beamer – a video projector (via German pseudo-anglicism Beamer) 
 oldtimer - an antique car
 sport - to exercise or engage in a sport
 touringcar – a coach (bus)

German

German pseudo anglicisms often have multiple valid and common ways of writing them, generally either hyphenated (Home-Office) or in one word (Homeoffice). Infrequently, CamelCase may also be used.

 Beamer –  a video projector
Bodybag – a messenger bag
 Dressman – a male model (Onysko calls this the 'canonical example' of a pseudo-anglicism.)
 Flipper – a pinball machine
 Funsport – a sport played for amusement, such as skateboarding or frisbee
 Handy – a mobile phone
 Homeoffice – working from home, used as a noun
 Jobticket – a free pass for public transport provided by an employer for employees
 Oldtimer – an antique car
 Public Viewing – a public viewing event (party) of a football match or similar
 Shooting – a photoshoot

 trampen (verb) – hitchhiking
 mobbing - bullying

Norwegian

 sixpence – Flat cap

Swedish

 after work – a meeting for drinks after the workday is finished
 backslick – A wet, combed-back hair style
 pocket – A paper-back book

Slavic

Polish
 dres – tracksuit; sometimes also short for dresiarz (chav)
  – USB flash drive
  – campsite

Russian

 Дресс-кроссинг ("Dress crossing") – clothing swap (analogous to postcrossing, bookcrossing); not to be confused with cross-dressing
  ("Clip maker") – music video director
  ("strikeball") – airsoft
  ("Face control") – the policy of screening people based on their appearance
Аниматор ("Animator") – children's entertainer
  ("camping") – campsite
  ("records man") – record holder

Austronesian

Tagalog 

 jeepney – a mode of public transport in the Philippines, much like a form of share taxi

Malaysian Malay 
 action - boast; boastful 
 best - good 
 cable - personal connection or insider 
 power - great 
 sound - scold 
 spender - undergarment for lower body e.g briefs and panties
 terror - great

other languages

Hebrew 
projector - head of project

See also

 Anglicism
 Barbarism (modern linguistics)
 Calque
 Denglisch
 False friend
 Language transfer
 Loanword
 List of pseudo-German words adapted to English
 List of pseudo-French words adapted to English
 Phono-semantic matching
 Wasei-eigo

References

Sources
 
 
 
 
 

 
 
 
 
 
 
 
 
  
 
 
 
 
 Rosenhouse, Judith, Rotem Kowner, eds., Globally Speaking: Motives for Adopting English Vocabulary in Other Languages, 2008,

Further reading

 James Stanlaw 2004, Japanese English: Language And The Culture Contact, Hong Kong University Press.
 Laura Miller 1997, "Wasei eigo: English ‘loanwords' coined in Japan" in The Life of Language: Papers in Linguistics in Honor of William Bright, edited by Jane Hill, P.J. Mistry and Lyle Campbell, Mouton/De Gruyter: The Hague, pp. 123–139.
 Geoff Parkes and Alan Cornell 1992, 'NTC's Dictionary of German False Cognates', National Textbook Company, NTC Publishing Group.
 Ghil'ad Zuckermann 2003, ‘‘Language Contact and Lexical Enrichment in Israeli Hebrew’’, Houndmills: Palgrave Macmillan, (Palgrave Studies in Language History and Language Change, Series editor: Charles Jones). .

External links
 Examples of Japanese pseudo-anglicisms

Forms of English
Language histories

ru:Псевдоанглицизм